Topsportcentrum may refer to:

Topsportcentrum (Rotterdam), Netherlands
Topsportcentrum (Almere), Netherlands
Topsportcentrum (Zwolle), Netherlands
Topsportcentrum (Ghent), Belgium